Salem Veteran Affairs Medical Center (VAMC) is one of the largest VA hospitals located at 1970 Roanoke Blvd. Salem, Virginia 24153. Since 1934 VAMC in Salem has been improving the health of the men and women who have so proudly served the United States Navy, United States Army, United States Air Force, United States Coast Guard and United States Marines. Health care services have been provided to more than 112,500 veterans living in a  26-county area of southwestern Virginia. Salem VAMC provided community-based outpatient clinics.  In addition to the main facility in Salem, there are affiliated services in three community-based outpatient clinics. These clinics are located in Danville, Virginia, Lynchburg, Virginia, Tazewell, Virginia, Wytheville, Virginia, and Staunton, Virginia.

Roanoke Veterans Administration Hospital Historic District
The Roanoke Veterans Administration Hospital Historic District is a national historic district encompassing 34 contributing buildings, 2 contributing sites, 17 contributing structures, and 1 contributing object.  Construction began on the Roanoke (now Salem) VA Hospital in 1934, and various additions were constructed through 1950.  The Main Building (1934) is situated on a raised elevation over the front lawn and serves as the focal point of the historic district. Other buildings include the Administration Building (1934), Dining Hall/Attendants’ Quarters (1934), Recreation Building (1934), Colored Patients’ Building (1934), four Continued Treatment Buildings (1938, 1941, 1940, 1938), and Neuropsychiatric Infirmary Building (1936) The buildings exhibit the Colonial Revival and Classical Revival architectural styles that were nationally popular at the time. It was listed on the National Register of Historic Places in 2012.

References

External links
Salem VA Medical Center homepage

Hospital buildings completed in 1934
Hospital buildings completed in 1936
Hospital buildings completed in 1950
Historic districts on the National Register of Historic Places in Virginia
Houses on the National Register of Historic Places in Virginia
National Register of Historic Places in Salem, Virginia
Colonial Revival architecture in Virginia
Neoclassical architecture in Virginia
Houses in Salem, Virginia
Hospitals in Virginia
Veterans Affairs medical facilities
Historic American Buildings Survey in Virginia
1934 establishments in Virginia